Abel Lee (born Abel Evans, 1884–1929) was an English professional football right half who played in the Football League for Grimsby Town and in the Southern League for New Brompton/Gillingham.

Career
Born in Staveley, Derbyshire, he played for minor teams Wombwell Rising Star and Darfield United

Lee joined Football League club Grimsby Town in 1906. Lee was made club captain from 1908 through to 1911. He played 86 times for the club.

Lee joined New Brompton of the Southern League in 1911. He remained with the club, later renamed Gillingham, until 1920 and made over 150 appearances. In 1920 Gillingham gained election to the Football League and replaced most of their existing squad with new players. Lee, by now a veteran at around 36 years old, was one of those who left the club, and it is unknown if he went on to play anywhere else.

References

1884 births
1929 deaths
People from Staveley, Derbyshire
Footballers from Derbyshire
English footballers
Association football wing halves
Darfield United F.C. players
Grimsby Town F.C. players
Gillingham F.C. players
English Football League players
Southern Football League players